John Kennedy Rideout (1912, Leeds- 1950, Hong Kong) was a British Professor of Oriental Studies at the University of Sydney (succeeding Arthur Lindsay Sadler) and at the University of Hong Kong. A specialist in Chinese language and literature, he was a classical scholar at Oxford before pursuing studies in Far Eastern languages from the SOAS, where he also taught from 1942. He left the University of Sydney after one year, having found the library without Chinese books, and the Australian National University unwilling to loan the books they had received from the Chinese ambassador, Kan Nai-kuang He disappeared of February 16, 1950, and his body found twelve days later on the shores of Lantau Island, with some suspicion about a mooted connection to British intelligence, though the authorities ruled the death an accident.

References

1950 deaths
Academic staff of the University of Sydney
Academic staff of the University of Hong Kong
Alumni of the University of London
Place of birth missing
Deaths in Hong Kong
British sinologists
Linguists of Chinese
Chinese literature academics
Linguists from the United Kingdom
20th-century linguists
1912 births